PMR may refer to:

Science and technology 
 Paraxial marginal ray, paraxial optics term
 Perpendicular magnetic recording, a technology for data recording on hard disk
 PMR446, a license-free public walkie-talkie protocol in the European Union and the United Kingdom
 Professional mobile radio or "private mobile radio", VHF & UHF radio networks used by operators such as taxis, utilities and emergency services
 Proton magnetic resonance, alternate name for Proton (Hydrogen-1|1H) nuclear magnetic resonance

Health and medicine 
 Physical medicine and rehabilitation
 Polymyalgia rheumatica, inflammatory condition of the muscles
 Progressive muscle relaxation, a technique for learning to monitor and control the state of muscular tension

Places 
 Pridnestrovian Moldavian Republic, more commonly in the English language known as Transnistria, a breakaway state between the River Dniester and the eastern Moldovan border with Ukraine
 Palmerston North Airport, which has the IATA airport code PMR
 Peckham Rye railway station, which has station code PMR
 Pune Metropolitan Region, the metro area around the twin cities of Pune and Pimpri-Chinchwad in the Indian state of Maharashtra

Organizations 
 PMR Ltd, consulting, market research, publications
 Partidul Muncitoresc Român (Romanian Workers' Party), the ruling party in communist Romania from 1948 to 1965
 Parti Mauritanien pour le Renouveau, Mauritanian Party for Renewal, a political party in Mauritania
 Port Militarization Resistance, an anti-war organization in the United States
 TV PMR, a public television channel in Transnistria

Other 
 Problem management record, another term for "problem record" in problem management
 Preventive Maintenance Report, for Telecom Maintenance.
 Protected membrane roof, a roof where thermal insulation or another material is located above the waterproofing membrane
 Proto Matrix Rail, a paintball marker
 Penilaian Menengah Rendah, a public school examination in Malaysia abolished in 2014
 Pimp My Ride, a TV show produced by MTV and hosted by rapper Xzibit
 Project Management Review, part of Project Management.
 Pre-Millennium Radio, a cut radio station from Grand Theft Auto V that was originally intended to play 90s alternative rock and grunge music.